Copelatus distinguendus is a species of diving beetle. It is part of the genus Copelatus of the subfamily Copelatinae in the family Dytiscidae. It was described by Régimbart in 1903.

References

distinguendus
Beetles described in 1903